Sir Denis Stanislaus Henry, 1st Baronet,  (7 March 1864 – 1 October 1925), was an Irish lawyer and politician who became the first Lord Chief Justice of Northern Ireland.

Henry was born in Cahore, Draperstown, County Londonderry, the son of a prosperous Roman Catholic businessman. He was educated at Marist College, Dundalk, Mount St Mary's College, Spinkhill, North East Derbyshire (a Jesuit foundation) and Queen's College, Belfast, where he won every law scholarship available to a student in addition to many other prizes and exhibitions. In 1885, he was called to the Bar of Ireland.

During the general election campaign of 1895, Henry spoke in support of unionist candidates in two constituencies: Thomas Lea in South Londonderry, Henry's native constituency, and E. T. Herdman in East Donegal.

Henry's legal career flourished – he became Queen's Counsel in 1896 (which became King's Counsel on 21 January 1901 when Queen Victoria died), a Bencher of the King's Inns in 1898 and ultimately Father of the North-West Circuit – but his interest in politics did not diminish. In March 1905, he was a delegate at the inaugural meeting of the Ulster Unionist Council and in the North Tyrone by-election in 1907, he was the Unionist candidate, which he lost by a mere seven votes.

On 23 May 1916, he was elected as an MP in the South Londonderry by-election, the first by-election to be held in Ireland after the Easter Rising. The rebellion had had no discernible impact on the contest.

In November 1918, he became Solicitor-General for Ireland and in July 1919, Attorney General for Ireland. He later served as the first Lord Chief Justice of Northern Ireland from 1921 to 1925. In 1923, he became a Baronet, of Cahore in the County of Londonderry.

He married Violet Holmes, daughter of Hugh Holmes, a judge of the Court of Appeal in Ireland, and Olivia Moule of Elmley Lovett, Worcestershire. They had five children, including James Holmes Henry, who succeeded as second baronet. It was a mixed marriage as Violet was a staunch member of the Church of Ireland. Despite their religious difference, the marriage is said to have been happy.

He died in 1925, aged 61, and was buried near his native Draperstown.

References

External links

 
 

1864 births
1925 deaths
Catholic Unionists
Baronets in the Baronetage of the United Kingdom
Members of the Parliament of the United Kingdom for County Londonderry constituencies (1801–1922)
UK MPs 1910–1918
UK MPs 1918–1922
Irish barristers
Irish knights
Irish Queen's Counsel
Knights Commander of the Order of the British Empire
Solicitors-General for Ireland
Attorneys-General for Ireland
People from County Londonderry
Irish Unionist Party politicians
Lord chief justices of Northern Ireland
People educated at Mount St Mary's College
Members of the Privy Council of Ireland
Deputy Lieutenants of Londonderry
People educated at St Mary's College, Dundalk